Faustabryna celebiana is a species of beetle in the family Cerambycidae. It was described by Vives in 2014.

References

Pteropliini
Beetles described in 2014